Ouro Preto do Oeste is a municipality located in the Brazilian state of Rondônia. Its population was 35,737 (2020) and its area is 1,970 km².

References

Municipalities in Rondônia